Einar "Jeja" Gundersen (20 September 1896 – 29 October 1962) was a Norwegian footballer who played play as a centre-forward for Odd. He is regarded as one of Norwegian football's first star players. He played 33 internationals for Norway, and his 26 international goals puts him second on the national team's all-time scoring list.

His nickname Jeja means literally "Me Then", as that was what he wondered as a kid when he was not picked for the team.

At club level, Gundersen scored more than 200 goals. He won the Norwegian Cup five times. He was also a member of the Norwegian team that played in the 1920 Olympics, and scored twice in the 3–1 win against England's amateur side.

References

External links
 

1896 births
1962 deaths
Norwegian footballers
Association football forwards
Norway international footballers
Footballers at the 1920 Summer Olympics
Olympic footballers of Norway
Odds BK players
FC Sète 34 players
Norwegian expatriate footballers
Norwegian expatriate sportspeople in France
Expatriate footballers in France